Rhamnella gilgitica is a species of plant in the family Rhamnaceae. It occurs in Pakistan.

References

gilgitica
Vulnerable plants
Flora of Pakistan
Taxonomy articles created by Polbot